The 2010–11 Football League (known as the npower Football League for sponsorship reasons) was the 112th completed season of the Football League. It began in August 2010 and concluded in May 2011, with the promotion play-off finals.

The Football League is contested through three Divisions. The divisions are the League Championship, League One and League Two. The winner and the runner up of the League Championship are automatically promoted to the Premier League and they are joined by the winner of the League Championship playoff. The bottom two teams in League Two are relegated to the Conference Premier.

This was the first season that npower sponsored the league, after Coca-Cola's contract expired at the end of the 2009–10 season.

Promotion and relegation

From Premier League
Relegated to Championship
 Burnley
 Hull City
 Portsmouth

From Championship
Promoted to Premier League
 Newcastle United
 West Bromwich Albion
 Blackpool

Relegated to League One
 Sheffield Wednesday
 Plymouth Argyle
 Peterborough United

From Football League One
Promoted to Championship
 Brighton & Hove Albion
 Southampton
 Peterborough United

Relegated to League Two
 Gillingham
 Wycombe Wanderers
 Southend United
 Stockport County

From Football League Two
Promoted to League One
 Notts County
 Bournemouth
 Rochdale
 Dagenham & Redbridge

Relegated to Conference Premier
 Grimsby Town
 Darlington

From Conference Premier
Promoted to League Two
 Stevenage Borough
 Oxford United

Championship

Table

Play-offs

Results

Top scorers

League One

Table

Play-offs

Results

Top scorers

League Two

Table

Play-offs

Results

Top scorers

Managerial changes

References

External links
Football League website
BBC Sport

 
2010–11
2010–11 in English football leagues

ko:풋볼 리그 챔피언십 10-11